State Road 29 (NM 29) is a state highway in the US state of New Mexico. NM 29's southern terminus is at NM 17 in Chama, and the northern terminus is at the entrance to Edward Sargent Wildlife Area in Chama.

Major intersections

See also

References

029
Transportation in Rio Arriba County, New Mexico